Minuteman Regional Vocational Technical High School is a Public Vocational High School (grades 9-12) located in Lexington, Massachusetts, United States. The school serves the towns of Acton, Arlington, Bolton, Concord, Dover, Lancaster, Lexington, Needham, and Stow. Minuteman is a member of the Commonwealth Athletic Conference for sports, which competes at the Division 5 level of athletics in Massachusetts. The school's mascot is the Mustangs, and the school's colors are navy blue, gold, and white. Minuteman was recognized as a National Blue Ribbon School by the Department of Education in 2018.

Curriculum and programs offered

Minuteman combines academics and college preparation (the main purpose of traditional high schools) with carefully designed courses related to career exploration and learning (the main purpose of vocational-technical schools). The original school planners focused on needs of students living along  Massachusetts' high-tech corridor. Other area schools, under state regulations, are not allowed to operate the Chapter 74 technical programs available at Minuteman.

Minuteman currently offers 19 different vocational & technical shop concentrations for the students. The programs Minuteman offers are listed below.

Animal Science
Bio-Technology
Horticulture 
Environmental Technology
Health Occupations
Graphic Design
Computer Technology
Robotics
Engineering
Cosmetology
Culinary Arts 
Early Education
Automotive
Carpentry
Electrical
Plumbing
Welding & Metal Fabrication
Advanced Manufacturing
Multimedia Engineering

Campus

Minuteman has a 65-acre campus that sits just west of Route 128, at the intersection of Massachusetts Avenue and Marrett Road (Route 2A) in Lexington, Massachusetts.

Athletics

Minuteman currently offers 16 different sports that students can participate in at the school. Minuteman is a member of the Commonwealth Athletic Conference for sports, and the school mascot is the Mustangs, and the schools colors are Navy Blue, Gold, and White. Minuteman's athletic teams compete at the Division 4 & 5 level in Massachusetts. A list of the sports offered at Minuteman are listed below.

Fall Sports
Football
Boys' Soccer
Girls' Soccer
Cross Country
Cheerleading
Golf
Winter Sports
Boys' Basketball
Girls' Basketball
Ice Hockey
Swimming
Spring Sports
Baseball
Softball
Lacrosse
Tennis

See also
 List of high schools in Massachusetts
 Vocational school

References

External links
 Official website

Commonwealth Athletic Conference
Vocational education in the United States
Arlington, Massachusetts
Buildings and structures in Lexington, Massachusetts
Schools in Middlesex County, Massachusetts
Public high schools in Massachusetts